Ilias Iliadis (born 21 March 2001) is a professional footballer who plays as a midfielder for CF Montréal of Major League Soccer. Born in Canada, he has represented Greece at youth international level.

Early life
He played youth soccer with Scarborough Olympic Flame SC. He also played youth soccer with the Serbian White Eagles. In January 2015, he joined the Panathinaikos Academy after attending an Arsenal academy camp in Greece. In October 2018, he signed a professional contract with the club.

Club career
In August 2021, he joined Panathinaikos B in the Super League Greece 2 ahead of their inaugural season, after extending his contract with the club for two more seasons. He made his professional debut on November 7 against Kifisia. In December 2022, he requested to terminate his contract, in order to return to Canada, after having spent the previous eight years in Greece.

In January 2023, Major League Soccer side CF Montréal announced they had signed Iliadis to a two-year contract, with options for 2025 and 2026. He made his debut in a substitute appearance on March 4 against Austin FC.

International career
Eligible for Canada and Greece, Iliadis has represented the latter at the under-17 level.

References

External links

2001 births
Living people
Greek footballers
Canadian soccer players
Greece youth international footballers
Super League Greece 2 players
Panathinaikos F.C. players
Association football midfielders
Panathinaikos F.C. B players
Canadian people of Greek descent
CF Montréal players
Major League Soccer players